ExtraHop is a cybersecurity company providing AI-based network intelligence that stops advanced threats across cloud, hybrid, and distributed environments.

History

Jesse Rothstein and Raja Mukerji founded ExtraHop in 2007 in Seattle, Washington, USA.  The co-founders were
formerly senior engineers at F5 Networks and architects of the
BIG-IP v9 product.

Early on, ExtraHop acquired $6.6 million in funding from the Madrona Venture Group and other private investors including Marc Andreessen and Ben Horowitz. In May 2014, the company closed a $41 million Series C round led by Technology Crossover Ventures (TCV). Other participants in this round included existing investors Meritech Capital Partners and Madrona Venture Group, as well as private investors including Sujal Patel, former CEO and founder of Isilon Systems. This round brought ExtraHop’s total venture funding to $61.6 million.

After debuting as a Visionary in the Gartner Magic Quadrant for Network Performance Monitoring and Diagnostics in 2017,  in 2018 ExtraHop formally expanded into the cyber security market with the release of the Reveal(x) product, followed 2 years later by the launch of SaaS-based Reveal(x) 360. In January 2019, the company announced having booked $100 million in revenue for the previous year. 

In July 2021, ExtraHop was acquired by Bain Capital Private Equity and Crosspoint Capital Partners for $900 million. In February 2022, the company announced that it had appointed Patrick Dennis as CEO. The announcement also highlighted growth metrics for the company, including 47% growth in annual recurring revenue (ARR), 54% year-over-year growth in new customer acquisition, and rapid adoption of its Reveal(x) 360 SaaS offering. In March, the company also announced Craig Weimer as its new CRO.

ExtraHop operates globally with offices in Seattle, Washington (HQ); London, UK; Germany; France; Australia; Singapore; and Japan.

Products

ExtraHop sells products for Enterprise Security and IT Operations use cases. The company launched the Reveal(x) network intelligence
product for Security Operations teams in 2018.  In 2020, the company introduced Reveal(x) 360, a fully SaaS-based version of their network detection and response platform. 

Reveal(x) and Reveal(x) 360 (hereinafter referred to as "Reveal(x)") use what the company calls "cloud-scale machine learning" (ML) algorithms and rule-based techniques to detect behaviors, anomalies,  and software vulnerabilities to provide security recommendations in actionable Detection Cards, and curate threat intelligence indicators of compromise of known threats. 

Reveal(x) securely decrypts and analyzes traffic in real time, to collect intelligence and network threat telemetry that drive ML detections. These include:

–Detection of encrypted lateral movement, living off the land, and encrypted exploit attempts of CVEs such as PrintNightmare, ProxyLogon, Log4Shell, and Spring4Shell. 

–Detection of cloud attack techniques (eg, AWS IMDS proxying, AWS services enumeration)

–Hygiene detections (eg, insecure protocols, passwords in plaintext)

–IoT detections (abnormal behavior observed on an IoT device of a specific make and model)

–Network-based detection of abuse of encrypted Microsoft protocols (Active Directory, Kerberos, SMBv3, MSRPC), as well as TLS 1.3

–User behavior (eg, abnormal login behavior)

ExtraHop Reveal(x) works by extracting metadata from raw network traffic across more than 70 protocols, including the ability to decrypt Microsoft application and authentication protocols and Transport_Layer_Security#TLS_1.3. This data includes natively discovered information about endpoints/users such as MAC, Hostname, OS, software, application layer information, usernames, geolocation, passive DNS, and whois. Reveal(x) data can be enriched with threat intelligence and endpoint process data from partner products. ExtraHop detections include a timeline of related events, MITRE ATT&CK techniques, next steps for investigation and remediation, and 1-click access to forensic data such as transaction records and decrypted packets. These data can also be explored/filtered as a starting point for threat hunts. Customers can build, reuse, and share libraries of saved queries to speed recurring threat hunting tasks.
 
The core of ExtraHop technology is a passive network appliance that uses a network tap or port mirroring to receive network traffic, and then performs full-stream reassembly to extract application-level protocol metrics and other custom-specified information contained in the transaction payload. A subset of these metrics is sent to the cloud where they are used as machine learning features to proactively detect anomalous behavior that could indicate data breaches, ransomware, and other threats as well as performance issues. 

The ExtraHop network sensors can be deployed with self-managed physical and virtual appliances, or as a zero-infrastructure SaaS product. Network sensors can be deployed on-premises in data centers, on campus, at remote sites, and in cloud environments including Amazon Web Services (AWS), Microsoft Azure ,and Google Cloud Platform (GCP).

Integrations
ExtraHop Reveal(x) natively integrates with a number of technology products, including endpoint security (CrowdStrike), threat intelligence, and Saas/IaaS/PaaS platforms such as Microsoft 365 and AWS native telemetry. 

A sample list of known integrations includes: CrowdStrike; Microsoft Defender Security Center; Windows Defender ATP; Microsoft 365; AWS quarantine; Azure Sentinel; Cisco ISE; Palo Alto NGFW, Panorama, Demisto; Splunk SIEM & Phantom; Exabeam; IBM Qradar; ServiceNow; and Check Point.

Certifications

ExtraHop holds a number of industry certifications. These include SOC 2 Type II, SOC 3, GDPR, HIPAA and US Privacy Shield.

Customers
Known ExtraHop customers include Ulta Beauty, The Home Depot, and The City of Dallas.

Company Leadership

Patrick Dennis, Chief Executive Officer; Jesse Rothstein, Co-Founder & Chief Technology Officer; Raja Mukerji, Co-Founder and Chief Customer Officer; Bill Ruckelshaus, Chief Financial Officer; Craig Weimer, Chief Revenue Officer; Bryce Hein, Chief Marketing Officer; John Matthews, Chief Information Officer; Tom O'Brien, General Counsel; Sweety Rath, Vice President of Human Resources

Funding

On July 22, 2021, Bain Capital Private Equity and Crosspoint Capital Partners acquired ExtraHop for $900M, marking a significant shift in the market away from a prevention-and-protection model and toward a detection-and-response approach. After extensive due diligence and market research, Bain and Crosspoint determined that Network Detection and Response (NDR) is poised to be the next major cybersecurity category, a segment that is already growing fast at 24% CAGR. Both parties agreed, ExtraHop provides the best-in-class team and the best-in-class product in the NDR market and entered into an agreement to acquire ExtraHop in June 2021. 

Prior to the acquisition, ExtraHop’s last funding was in 2014, a $41M Series C round that brought total funding to just over $61M. The company's Series B was a $14M round closed in May 2011, preceded by a $5.1M Series A in April 2009. Unlike many technology companies that exit at comparable valuations, ExtraHop raised very limited capital and was largely self-funded.

References

Companies based in Seattle
Security technology
Network management